Listed are current and past tennis chair umpires who hold or have held a gold badge International Tennis Federation (ITF) rating. Gold badge umpires typically officiate Grand Slam, ATP World Tour and WTA Tour matches. The list includes only those who hold or have held a gold badge as a chair umpire, and not those who hold or have held a similar badge in refereeing or chief umpiring. The year, where included, indicates when the umpire obtained his or her respective gold badge status.

There are three levels of training sanctioned by the International Tennis Federation. After officiating at non-pro events, a chair umpire may enter the "Level 1" program in order to gain a green badge. This is taught in French and/or Spanish and is specifically aimed at officiating in South and Central America and Africa. "Level 2" schools are only taught in English and are for umpires who have already shown proficiency at ITF Pro Circuit events, Davis Cup and Fed Cup ties, and ATP and WTA sanctioned events. It is here that an umpire would receive a white badge. Those chair umpires who pass a "Level 3" school start as a Bronze Badge and can be promoted to Silver and then to Gold following a review of their work rate and performance in the annual review conducted by the ITF, ATP and WTA.

Active

Men

List of active gold-badge male tennis umpires:

Women

List of active gold-badge female tennis umpires:

Former
List of former gold-badge tennis umpires:

ATP Tour officials
The original 8 full-time world officials for the (then new) 1990 ATP Tour

 Dana Loconto (USA). Dana produced the first ever device to digitalize umpiring, the ATP palm-top. He was overruled by ITF Supervisor Ken Farrar in the 1996 US Open, during the Ríos-Tarango match.
 Gerry Armstrong (Great Britain). Gerry defaulted Mc Enroe in the 1990 Australian Open, after the rules had just been modified. ITF Supervisor Ken Farrar was called on court to confirm the new ruling.
 Paulo Pereira (Brazil). Paulo obtained a degree in civil engineering before moving full-time into the officiating world.
 Pedro Bravo (Chile). Pedro was a tennis teacher before umpiring. He worked for the Chilean Tennis Federation as Tournament Director. Now deceased.
 Richard Ings (Australia). Richard defaulted Robert Seguso in a match versus Andre Agassi at the 1989 Indian Wells ATP Tournament.
 Richard Kaufman (USA). After retirement, Richard became Director of Officials for the USTA and worked closely to Paul Hawkins to develop the Hawk-Eye system.
 Rudy Berger (Germany). Rudy worked in the Ministry of Justice in former West-Germany before becoming a full-time official. Deceased in 2007.
 Steve Ullrich (USA). Steve had a distinct voice that allowed tennis spectators to easily identify him when on the chair.

References

+
Tennis